"I Wish" is a song by J-pop idol group Morning Musume and was released September 6, 2000 as their tenth single. It sold a total of 654,640 copies. "I Wish" was the song used in Japanese commercials for the Sydney 2000 Olympic Games, which also featured the girls in the commercials. Lead vocals in the song are Ai Kago and Maki Goto. It was a number-one hit on the Oricon Charts in Japan.

Track listing
 I Wish
 
 I Wish (Instrumental)

Members at the time of single 
 1st generation: Yuko Nakazawa, Kaori Iida, Natsumi Abe
 2nd generation: Kei Yasuda, Mari Yaguchi
 3rd generation: Maki Goto
 4th generation: Rika Ishikawa, Hitomi Yoshizawa, Nozomi Tsuji, Ai Kago

References

Morning Musume songs
Zetima Records singles
2000 singles
Song recordings produced by Tsunku
2000 songs
Fight songs
Songs written by Tsunku